Before the Yemeni Revolution in 2011 and the following civil war, Yemen was a one party dominant state in which the General People's Congress (GPC) held power.

Legal status
Yemen's Political Parties Law mandates that political parties be viable national organizations comprising at least 75 founders and 2,500 members and not restrict membership to a particular region. The government provides financial support to political parties, including a stipend for newspaper publication.

Elections 2003–2006
The GPC captured 238 of 301 seats in parliament in the 2003 elections. In the September 2006 elections for local and governorate councils, the GPC garnered 315 seats in the governorates (74 percent of the popular vote) and 5,078 local council seats (74 percent of the popular vote). In the September 2006 presidential election, the Joint Meeting Parties (JMP) backed opposition candidate Faisal bin Shamlan, whose success in garnering 22 percent of the popular vote was viewed at the time as a first step in challenging the political stronghold of President Saleh and the GPC. However, disputes between the GPC and the JMP in 2007 over election law amendments, coupled with the JMP’s opposition to President Saleh’s proposed democratic reform measures, have halted initial attempts to forge a dialogue between the two parties.

List of parties
For the sake of clarity, this section is divided into three lists. These are major parties, minor parties and defunct parties. Major parties are defined as parties which gained a seat in the last elections in 2003. Since there has been a long time without elections with a lot of political shift in between, parties that either control territory with their armed wing (such as Ansar Allah) or have over 10.000 likes on facebook are also taken into this category. All other operating parties are listed under minor parties. Parties that are long inactive are listed as defunct, although some might be revived at some point.

Major parties

Minor parties

Defunct parties

List of coalitions
The National Council for the Forces of the Peaceful Revolution was declared on 17 August 2011, amidst the Yemeni Revolution, to unite the opposition groups, parties, coalitions, and youth protesters. Among the 143 representatives elected to sit on it are leaders from Al-Islah, the South Yemen Movement, the Alliance of Yemeni Tribes, and the defected First Armoured Division.
The Joint Meeting Parties (JMP) was formed in 2005 by five opposition parties to effect political and economic reform. It includes the northern-based, tribal, and Islamist-oriented Yemeni Congregation for Reform (Islah) and the secular Yemeni Socialist Party (YSP), which represents the remnants of the former South Yemeni leadership. According to Al Jazeera English, it was formed in 2002 and includes Islah, Yemeni Socialist Party (YSP), Hizb Al-Haq (a semi-religious party), the Unionist party, and the Popular Forces Union party. The spokesperson as of 23 March 2011 is Muhammad Qahtan, who replaced Mohammed Al-Sabri.
The Common Forum includes the five biggest opposition groups in Yemen, including Reform, Socialist, Nasserist, Popular Force and al-Haq. (Likely just another name for the JMP.)

See also
2011–2012 Yemeni revolution''

References

 
Yemen
Political parties
Political parties
Yemen